In Greek mythology, Orion (Ancient Greek: Ὠρίων or ; Latin: Orion) was a giant huntsman whom Zeus (or perhaps Artemis)  placed among the stars as the constellation of Orion.

Ancient sources told several different stories about Orion; there are two major versions of his birth and several versions of his death. The most important recorded episodes are his birth in Boeotia, his visit to Chios where he met Merope and raped her, being blinded by Merope's father, the recovery of his sight at Lemnos, his hunting with Artemis on Crete, his death by the bow of Artemis or the sting of the giant scorpion which became Scorpius, and his elevation to the heavens. Most ancient sources omit some of these episodes and several tell only one. These various incidents may originally have been independent, unrelated stories, and it is impossible to tell whether the omissions are simple brevity or represent a real disagreement.

In Greek literature he first appears as a great hunter in Homer's epic the Odyssey, where Odysseus sees his shade in the underworld. The bare bones of Orion's story are told by the Hellenistic and Roman collectors of myths, but there is no extant literary version of his adventures comparable, for example, to that of Jason in Apollonius of Rhodes' Argonautica or Euripides' Medea; the entry in Ovid's Fasti for May 11 is a poem on the birth of Orion, but that is one version of a single story. The surviving fragments of legend have provided a fertile field for speculation about Greek prehistory and myth.

Orion served several roles in ancient Greek culture. The story of the adventures of Orion, the hunter, is the one for which there is the most evidence (and even for that, not very much); he is also the personification of the constellation of the same name; he was venerated as a hero, in the Greek sense, in the region of Boeotia; and there is one etiological passage which says that Orion was responsible for the present shape of the Strait of Sicily.

Legends

Homer and Hesiod
Orion is mentioned in the oldest surviving works of Greek literature, which probably date back to the 7th or 8th century BC, but which are the products of an oral tradition with origins several centuries earlier. In Homer's Iliad Orion is described as a constellation, and the star Sirius is mentioned as his dog. In the Odyssey, Orion is essentially the pinnacle of human excellence in hunting: Odysseus sees him hunting in the underworld with a bronze club, a great slayer of animals. In some legends Orion claims to be able to hunt any animal in existence. He is also mentioned as a constellation, as the lover of the Goddess Dawn, as slain by Artemis, and as the most handsome of the earthborn. In the Works and Days of Hesiod, Orion is also a constellation, one whose rising and setting with the sun is used to reckon the year.

The legend of Orion was first told in full in a lost work by Hesiod, probably the Astronomia (simple references to Hesiod below will refer to the lost text from Astronomia, unless otherwise stated). This version is known through the work of Eratosthenes on the constellations, who gives a fairly long summary of Hesiod's episode on Orion. According to this version, Orion was likely the son of the sea-god Poseidon and Euryale, daughter of Minos, King of Crete. Orion could walk on the waves because of his father; he walked to the island of Chios where he got drunk and raped Merope, daughter of Oenopion, the ruler there. In vengeance, Oenopion blinded Orion and drove him away. Orion stumbled to Lemnos where Hephaestus—the smith-god—had his forge. Hephaestus told his servant, Cedalion, to guide Orion to the uttermost East where Helios, the Sun, healed him; Orion carried Cedalion around on his shoulders. Orion returned to Chios to punish Oenopion, but the king hid away underground and escaped Orion's wrath. Orion's next journey took him to Crete where he hunted with the goddess Artemis and her mother Leto, and in the course of the hunt, threatened to kill every beast on Earth. Gaia (Apollo in some versions, disapproving of his sister's relationship with a male) objected and sent a giant scorpion to kill Orion. The creature succeeded, and after his death, the goddesses asked Zeus to place Orion among the constellations. Zeus consented and, as a memorial to the hero's death, added the Scorpion to the heavens as well.

Other sources
Although Orion has a few lines in both Homeric poems and in the Works and Days, most of the stories about him are recorded in incidental allusions and in fairly obscure later writings. No great poet standardized the legend. The ancient sources for Orion's legend are mostly notes in the margins of ancient poets (scholia) or compilations by later scholars, the equivalent of modern reference works or encyclopedias; even the legend from Hesiod's Astronomy survives only in one such compilation. In several cases, including the summary of the Astronomy, although the surviving work bears the name of a famous scholar, such as Apollodorus of Athens, Eratosthenes, or Gaius Julius Hyginus, what survives is either an ancient forgery or an abridgement of the original compilation by a later writer of dubious competence; editors of these texts suggest that they may have borne the names of great scholars because they were abridgments, or even pupil's notes, based on the works of the scholars.

The margin of the Empress Eudocia's copy of the Iliad has a note summarizing a Hellenistic poet who tells a different story of Orion's birth. Here the gods Zeus, Hermes, and Poseidon come to visit Hyrieus of Tanagra, who roasts a whole bull for them. When they offer him a favor, he asks for the birth of sons. The gods take the bull's hide and urinate into it and bury it in the earth, then tell him to dig it up ten months later. When he does, he finds Orion; this explains why Orion is earthborn.

A second full telling (even shorter than the summary of Hesiod) is in a Roman-era collection of myths; the account of Orion is based largely on the mythologist and poet Pherecydes of Athens. Here Orion is described as earthborn and enormous in stature. This version also mentions Poseidon and Euryale as his parents. It adds a first marriage to Side before his marriage to Merope. All that is known about Side is that Hera threw her into Hades for rivalling her in beauty. It also gives a different version of Orion's death than the Iliad: Eos, the Dawn, fell in love with Orion and took him to Delos where Artemis killed him.

Another narrative on the constellations, three paragraphs long, is from a Latin writer whose brief notes have come down to us under the name of Hyginus. It begins with the oxhide story of Orion's birth, which this source ascribes to Callimachus and Aristomachus, and sets the location at Thebes or Chios. Hyginus has two versions. In one of them he omits Poseidon; a modern critic suggests this is the original version.

The same source tells two stories of the death of Orion. The first says that because of his "living joined in too great a friendship" with Oenopion, he boasted to Artemis and Leto that he could kill anything which came from Earth. Gaia (the personification of Earth in Greek mythology) objected and created the Scorpion. In the second story, Apollo, being jealous of Orion's love for Artemis, arranged for Artemis to kill him. Seeing Orion swimming in the ocean, a long way off, he remarked that Artemis could not possibly hit that black thing in the water. Feeling challenged, she sent an arrow right through it and killed Orion; when his body washed up on shore, she wept copiously, and decided to place Orion among the stars. He connects Orion with several constellations, not just Scorpius. Orion chased Pleione, the mother of the Pleiades, for seven years, until Zeus intervened and raised all of them to the stars. In Works and Days, Orion chases the Pleiades themselves. Canis Minor and Canis Major are his dogs, the one in front is called Procyon. They chase Lepus, the hare, although Hyginus says some critics thought this too base a prey for the noble Orion and have him pursuing Taurus, the bull, instead. A Renaissance mythographer adds other names for Orion's dogs: Leucomelaena, Maera, Dromis, Cisseta, Lampuris, Lycoctonus, Ptoophagus, Arctophonus.

Variants
There are numerous variants in other authors. Most of these are incidental references in poems and scholiasts. The Roman poet Virgil shows Orion as a giant wading through the Aegean Sea with the waves breaking against his shoulders; rather than, as the mythographers have it, walking on the water. There are several references to Hyrieus as the father of Orion that connect him to various places in Boeotia, including Hyria; this may well be the original story (although not the first attested), since Hyrieus is presumably the eponym of Hyria. He is also called Oeneus, although he is not the Calydonian Oeneus. Other ancient scholia say, as Hesiod does, that Orion was the son of Poseidon and his mother was a daughter of Minos; but they call the daughter Brylle or Hyeles. There are two versions where Artemis killed Orion, either with her arrows or by producing the Scorpion. In the second variant, Orion died of the Scorpion's sting as he does in Hesiod. Although Orion does not defeat the Scorpion in any version, several variants have it die from its wounds. Artemis is given various motives. One is that Orion boasted of his beast-killing and challenged her to a contest with the discus. Another is that he assaulted either Artemis herself or Opis, a Hyperborean maiden in her band of huntresses. Aratus's brief description, in his Astronomy, conflates the elements of the myth: according to Aratus, Orion attacks Artemis while hunting on Chios, and the Scorpion kills him there. Nicander, in his Theriaca, has the scorpion of ordinary size and hiding under a small (oligos) stone. Most versions of the story that continue after Orion's death tell of the gods raising Orion and the Scorpion to the stars, but even here a variant exists: Ancient poets differed greatly on whom Aesculapius brought back from the dead; the Argive epic poet Telesarchus is quoted as saying in a scholion that Aesculapius resurrected Orion. Other ancient authorities are quoted anonymously that Aesculapius healed Orion after he was blinded by Oenopion.

The story of Orion and Oenopion also varies. One source refers to Merope as Oenopion's wife, not his daughter. Another refers to Merope as the daughter of Minos and not of Oenopion. The longest version (a page in the Loeb) is from a collection of melodramatic plots drawn up by an Alexandrian poet for the Roman Cornelius Gallus to make into Latin verse. It describes Orion as slaying the wild beasts of Chios and looting the other inhabitants to make a bride-price for Oenopion's daughter, who is called Aëro or Leiro. Oenopion does not want to marry her to someone like Orion, and eventually Orion, in frustration, breaks into her bedchamber and rapes her. The text implies that Oenopion blinds him on the spot.

 Lucian includes a picture with Orion in a rhetorical description of an ideal building, in which Orion is walking into the rising sun with Lemnos nearby, Cedalion on his shoulder. He recovers his sight there with Hephaestus still watching in the background.

Latin sources add that Oenopion was the son of Dionysus. Dionysus sent satyrs to put Orion into a deep sleep so he could be blinded. One source tells the same story but converts Oenopion into Minos of Crete. It adds that an oracle told Orion that his sight could be restored by walking eastward and that he found his way by hearing the Cyclops' hammer, placing a Cyclops as a guide on his shoulder; it does not mention Cabeiri or Lemnos—this is presumably the story of Cedalion recast. Both Hephaestus and the Cyclopes were said to make thunderbolts; they are combined in other sources. One scholion, on a Latin poem, explains that Hephaestus gave Orion a horse.

Giovanni Boccaccio cites a lost Latin writer for the story that Orion and Candiope were son and daughter of Oenopion, king of Sicily. While the virgin huntsman Orion was sleeping in a cave, Venus seduced him; as he left the cave, he saw his sister shining as she crossed in front of it. He ravished her; when his father heard of this, he banished Orion. Orion consulted an oracle, which told him that if he went east, he would regain the glory of kingship. Orion, Candiope, and their son Hippologus sailed to Thrace, "a province eastward from Sicily". There he conquered the inhabitants, and became known as the son of Neptune. His son begat the Dryas mentioned in Statius.

Cult and popular appreciation
In Ancient Greece, Orion had a hero cult in the region of Boeotia. The number of places associated with his birth suggest that it was widespread. Hyria, the most frequently mentioned, was in the territory of Tanagra. A feast of Orion was held at Tanagra as late as the Roman Empire. They had a tomb of Orion most likely at the foot of Mount Cerycius (now Mount Tanagra). Maurice Bowra argues that Orion was a national hero of the Boeotians, much as Castor and Pollux were for the Dorians. He bases this claim on the Athenian epigram on the Battle of Coronea in which a hero gave the Boeotian army an oracle, then fought on their side and defeated the Athenians.

The Boeotian school of epic poetry was chiefly concerned with the genealogies of the gods and heroes; later writers elaborated this web. Several other myths are attached to Orion in this way: A papyrus fragment of the Boeotian poet Corinna gives Orion fifty sons (a traditional number). This included the oracular hero Acraephen, who, she sings, gave a response to Asopus regarding Asopus' daughters who were abducted by the gods. Corinna sang of Orion conquering and naming all the land of the dawn. Bowra argues that Orion was believed to have delivered oracles as well, probably at a different shrine. Hyginus says that Hylas's mother was Menodice, daughter of Orion. Another mythographer, Liberalis, tells of Menippe and Metioche, daughters of Orion, who sacrificed themselves for their country's good and were transformed into comets.

Orion also has etiological connection to the city of Messina in Sicily. Diodorus of Sicily wrote a history of the world up to his own time (the beginning of the reign of Augustus). He starts with the gods and the heroes. At the end of this part of the work, he tells the story of Orion and two wonder-stories of his mighty earth-works in Sicily. One tells how he aided Zanclus, the founder of Zancle (the former name for Messina), by building the promontory which forms the harbor. The other, which Diodorus ascribes to Hesiod, relates that there was once a broad sea between Sicily and the mainland. Orion built the whole Peloris, the Punta del Faro, and the temple to Poseidon at the tip, after which he settled in Euboea. He was then "numbered among the stars of heaven and thus won for himself immortal remembrance". The Renaissance historian and mathematician Francesco Maurolico, who came from Messina, identified the remains of a temple of Orion near the present Messina Cathedral. Maurolico also designed an ornate fountain, built by the sculptor Giovanni Angelo Montorsoli in 1547, in which Orion is a central figure, symbolizing the Emperor Charles V, also a master of the sea and restorer of Messina;  Orion is still a popular symbol of the city.

Images of Orion in classical art are difficult to recognize, and clear examples are rare. There are several ancient Greek images of club-carrying hunters that could represent Orion, but such generic examples could equally represent an archetypal "hunter", or indeed Heracles. Some claims have been made that other Greek art represents specific aspects of the Orion myth. A tradition of this type has been discerned in 5th century BC Greek pottery—John Beazley identified a scene of Apollo, Delian palm in hand, revenging Orion for the attempted rape of Artemis, while another scholar has identified a scene of Orion attacking Artemis as she is revenged by a snake (a counterpart to the scorpion) in a funerary group—supposedly symbolizing the hope that even the criminal Orion could be made immortal, as well as an astronomical scene in which Cephalus is thought to stand in for Orion and his constellation, also reflecting this system of iconography. Also, a tomb frieze in Taranto (c. 300 BC) may show Orion attacking Opis. But the earliest surviving clear depiction of Orion in classical art is Roman, from the depictions of the Underworld scenes of the Odyssey discovered at the Esquiline Hill (50–40 BC). Orion is also seen on a 4th-century bas-relief, currently affixed to a wall in the Porto neighborhood of Naples. The constellation Orion rises in November, the end of the sailing season, and was associated with stormy weather, and this characterization extended to the mythical Orion—the bas-relief may be associated with the sailors of the city.

Interpretations

Renaissance

Mythographers have discussed Orion at least since the Renaissance of classical learning; the Renaissance interpretations were allegorical. In the 14th century, Boccaccio interpreted the oxhide story as representing human conception; the hide is the womb, Neptune the moisture of semen, Jupiter its heat, and Mercury the female coldness; he also explained Orion's death at the hands of the moon-goddess as the Moon producing winter storms. The 16th-century Italian mythographer Natalis Comes interpreted the whole story of Orion as an allegory of the evolution of a storm cloud: Begotten by air (Zeus), water (Poseidon), and the sun (Apollo), a storm cloud is diffused (Chios, which Comes derives from χέω, "pour out"), rises though the upper air (Aërope, as Comes spells Merope), chills (is blinded), and is turned into rain by the moon (Artemis). He also explains how Orion walked on the sea: "Since the subtler part of the water which is rarefied rests on the surface, it is said that Orion learned from his father how to walk on water." Similarly, Orion's conception made him a symbol of the philosophical child, an allegory of philosophy springing from multiple sources, in the Renaissance as in alchemical works, with some variations. The 16th-century German alchemist Michael Maier lists the fathers as Apollo, Vulcan and Mercury, and the 18th-century French alchemist Antoine-Joseph Pernety gave them as Jupiter, Neptune and Mercury.

Modern
Modern mythographers have seen the story of Orion as a way to access local folk tales and cultic practices directly without the interference of ancient high culture; several of them have explained Orion, each through his own interpretation of Greek prehistory and of how Greek mythology represents it. There are some points of general agreement between them: for example, that the attack on Opis is an attack on Artemis, for Opis is one of the names of Artemis.

There was a movement in the late nineteenth century to interpret all the Boeotian heroes as merely personifications of the constellations; there has since come to be wide agreement that the myth of Orion existed before there was a constellation named for him. Homer, for example, mentions Orion, the Hunter, and Orion, the constellation, but never confuses the two. Once Orion was recognized as a constellation, astronomy in turn affected the myth. The story of Side may well be a piece of astronomical mythology. The Greek word side means pomegranate, which bears fruit while Orion, the constellation, can be seen in the night sky. Rose suggests she is connected with Sidae in Boeotia, and that the pomegranate, as a sign of the Underworld, is connected with her descent there.

The 19th-century German classical scholar Erwin Rohde viewed Orion as an example of the Greeks erasing the line between the gods and mankind. That is, if Orion was in the heavens, other mortals could hope to be also.

The Hungarian mythographer Karl Kerényi, one of the founders of the modern study of Greek mythology, wrote about Orion in Gods of the Greeks (1951). Kerényi portrays Orion as a giant of Titanic vigor and criminality, born outside his mother as were Tityos or Dionysus. Kerényi places great stress on the variant in which Merope is the wife of Oenopion. He sees this as the remnant of a lost form of the myth in which Merope was Orion's mother (converted by later generations to his stepmother and then to the present forms). Orion's blinding is therefore parallel to that of Aegypius and Oedipus.

In Dionysus (1976), Kerényi portrays Orion as a shamanic hunting hero, surviving from Minoan times (hence his association with Crete). Kerényi derives Hyrieus (and Hyria) from the Cretan dialect word  , meaning "beehive", which survives only in ancient dictionaries. From this association he turns Orion into a representative of the old mead-drinking cultures, overcome by the wine masters Oenopion and Oeneus. (The Greek for "wine" is oinos.) Fontenrose cites a source stating that Oenopion taught the Chians how to make wine before anybody else knew how.

Joseph Fontenrose wrote Orion: the Myth of the Hunter and the Huntress (1981) to show Orion as the type specimen of a variety of grotesque hero. Fontenrose views him as similar to Cúchulainn, that is, stronger, larger, and more potent than ordinary men and the violent lover of the Divine Huntress; other heroes of the same type are Actaeon, Leucippus (son of Oenomaus), Cephalus, Teiresias, and Zeus as the lover of Callisto. Fontenrose also sees Eastern parallels in the figures of Aqhat, Attis, Dumuzi, Gilgamesh, Dushyanta, and Prajapati (as pursuer of Ushas).

In The Greek Myths (1955), Robert Graves views Oenopion as his perennial Year-King, at the stage where the king pretends to die at the end of his term and appoints a substitute, in this case Orion, who actually dies in his place. His blindness is iconotropy from a picture of Odysseus blinding the Cyclops, mixed with a purely Hellenic solar legend: the Sun-hero is captured and blinded by his enemies at dusk, but escapes and regains his sight at dawn, when all beasts flee him. Graves sees the rest of the myth as a syncretism of diverse stories. These include Gilgamesh and the Scorpion-Men, Set becoming a scorpion to kill Horus and the story of Aqhat and Yatpan from Ras Shamra, as well as a conjectural story of how the priestesses of Artemis Opis killed a visitor to their island of Ortygia. He compares Orion's birth from the bull's hide to a West African rainmaking charm and claims that the son of Poseidon should be a rainmaker.

Cultural references
The ancient Greek and Roman sources which tell more about Orion than his being a gigantic huntsman are mostly both dry and obscure, but poets do write of him: The brief passages in Aratus and Virgil are mentioned above. Pindar celebrates the pancratist Melissus of Thebes "who was not granted the build of an Orion", but whose strength was still great.

Cicero translated Aratus in his youth; he made the Orion episode half again longer than it was in the Greek, adding the traditional Latin topos of madness to Aratus's text. Cicero's Aratea is one of the oldest Latin poems to come down to us as more than isolated lines; this episode may have established the technique of including epyllia in non-epic poems.

Orion is used by Horace, who tells of his death at the hands of Diana/Artemis, and by Ovid, in his Fasti for May 11, the middle day of the Lemuria, when (in Ovid's time) the constellation Orion set with the sun. Ovid's episode tells the story of Hyrieus and two gods, Jupiter and Neptune, although Ovid is bashful about the climax; Ovid makes Hyrieus a poor man, which means the sacrifice of an entire ox is more generous. There is also a single mention of Orion in his Art of Love, as a sufferer from unrequited love: "Pale Orion wandered in the forest for Side."

Statius mentions Orion four times in his Thebaïd; twice as the constellation, a personification of storm, but twice as the ancestor of Dryas of Tanagra, one of the defenders of Thebes. The very late Greek epic poet Nonnus mentions the oxhide story in brief, while listing the Hyrians in his Catalogue of the Boeotian army of Dionysius.

References since antiquity are fairly rare. At the beginning of the 17th century, French sculptor Barthélemy Prieur cast a bronze statue Orion et Cédalion, some time between 1600 and 1611. This featured Orion with Cedalion on his shoulder, in a depiction of the ancient legend of Orion recovering his sight; the sculpture is now displayed at the Louvre.

Nicolas Poussin painted Paysage avec Orion aveugle cherchant le soleil (1658) ("Landscape with blind Orion seeking the sun"), after learning of the description by the 2nd-century Greek author Lucian, of a picture of Orion recovering his sight; Poussin included a storm-cloud, which both suggests the transient nature of Orion's blindness, soon to be removed like a cloud exposing the sun, and includes Natalis Comes' esoteric interpretation of Orion as a storm-cloud. Poussin need not have consulted Lucian directly; the passage is in the notes of the illustrated French translation of Philostratus' Imagines which Poussin is known to have consulted.  The Austrian Daniel Seiter (active in Turin, Italy), painted Diane auprès du cadavre d'Orion (c. 1685) ("Diana next to Orion's corpse"), pictured above.

In Endymion (1818), John Keats includes the line "Or blind Orion hungry for the morn", thought to be inspired by Poussin. William Hazlitt may have introduced Keats to the painting—he later wrote the essay "On Landscape of Nicholas Poussin", published in Table Talk, Essays on Men and Manners (1821-2). Richard Henry Horne, writing in the generation after Keats and Hazlitt, penned the three volume epic poem Orion in 1843. It went into at least ten editions and was reprinted by the Scholartis Press in 1928.

Science fiction author Ben Bova re-invented Orion as a time-traveling servant of various gods in a series of five novels. In The Blood of Olympus, the final volume of a series, Rick Riordan depicts Orion as one of the giant sons of the earth goddess Gaea.

Italian composer Francesco Cavalli wrote the opera, L'Orione in 1653. The story is set on the Greek island of Delos and focuses on Diana's love for Orion as well as on her rival, Aurora. Diana shoots Orion only after being tricked by Apollo into thinking him a sea monster—she then laments his death and searches for Orion in the underworld until he is elevated to the heavens. French composer Louis de La Coste composed in 1728 the tragédie lyrique Orion. This time, it is Diana who is in love with Orion and is rejected by him. Johann Christian Bach ('the English Bach') wrote an opera, Orion, or Diana Reveng'd, first presented at London's Haymarket Theatre in 1763. Orion, sung by a castrato, is in love with Candiope, the daughter of Oenopion, King of Arcadia but his arrogance has offended Diana. Diana's oracle forbids him to marry Candiope and foretells his glory and death. He bids a touching farewell to Candiope and marches off to his destiny. Diana allows him his victory and then kills him, offstage, with her arrow. In another aria, his mother Retrea (Queen of Thebes), laments his death but ultimately sees his elevation to the heavens. The 2002 opera Galileo Galilei by American composer Philip Glass includes an opera within an opera piece between Orion and Merope. The sunlight, which heals Orion's blindness, is an allegory of modern science. Philip Glass has also written a shorter work on Orion, as have Tōru Takemitsu, Kaija Saariaho, and John Casken. David Bedford's late-twentieth-century works are about the constellation rather than the mythical figure; he is an amateur astronomer.

The twentieth-century French poet René Char found the blind, lustful huntsman, both pursuer and pursued, a central symbol, as James Lawler has explained at some length in his 1978 work René Char: the Myth and the Poem. French novelist Claude Simon likewise found Orion an apt symbol, in this case of the writer, as he explained in his Orion aveugle of 1970. Marion Perret argues that Orion is a silent link in T. S. Eliot's The Waste Land (1922), connecting the lustful Actaeon/Sweeney to the blind Teiresias and, through Sirius, to the Dog "that's friend to men".

See also
 Standing on the shoulders of giants
 Rudra
Orion (sculpture)

Notes

References

Giovanni Boccaccio; Genealogie Deorum Gentilium Libri. ed. Vincenzo Romano. Vol. X and XI of Opere, Bari 1951. The section about Orion is Vol XI, p. 557–560: Book IX §19 is a long chapter about Orion himself; §20–21 are single paragraphs about his son and grandson (and the genealogy continues through §25 about Phyllis daughter of Lycurgus).
Natalis Comes: Mythologiae siue explicationis fabularum libri decem; translated as Natale Conti's Mythologiae, translated and annotated by John Mulryan and Steven Brown; Arizona Center for Medieval and Renaissance Studies, 2006.  This is cited by the page number in the 1616 printing, followed by the page in Mulryan and Brown. The chapter on Orion is VIII, 13, which is pp. 457–9 Tritonius; II 751–5 Mulryan and Brown.
Joseph Fontenrose Orion: The Myth of the Hunter and the Huntress Berkeley : University of California Press (1981) 
E. H. Gombrich: "The Subject of Poussin's Orion" The Burlington Magazine, Vol. 84, No. 491. (Feb., 1944), pp. 37–41
Robert Graves, The Greek Myths Penguin 1955;  is the 1988 reprint by a different publisher.
Karl Kerényi, Gods of the Greeks, tr. Norman Cameron.  Thames and Hudson 1951.  is a reprint, by the same publisher.
Karl Kerényi, Dionysus: Archetypal Image of Indestructible Life. Princeton University Press, 1976. 
David Kubiak: "The Orion Episode of Cicero's Aratea" The Classical Journal, Vol. 77, No. 1. (October–November, 1981), pp. 12–22.
Roger Pack, "A Romantic Narrative in Eunapius";  Transactions and Proceedings of the American Philological Association, Vol. 83. (1952), pp. 198–204. JSTOR link. A practicing classicist retells Orion in passing.
H. J. Rose (1928). A Handbook of Greek Mythology, pp. 115–117. London and New York: Routledge, 1991. .

External links

Theoi.com: Orion Excerpts from translations from Greek and Roman texts.
Star Tales – Orion Constellation mythology.
Orion Facts, Mythology & Its Cultural Significance Everything You Need To Know About Orion.
Natalis Comes Mythologiae siue explicationis fabularum libri decem Scan of 1616 Padua edition, ed M. Antonius Tritonius, pr. Petropaulus Tozzius. 
  of Boccaccio's Genealogiae; apparently scan of edition cited. 

Astronomical myths
Boeotian characters in Greek mythology
Children of Poseidon
Consorts of Eos
Deeds of Apollo
Deeds of Artemis
Deeds of Zeus
Mythological hunters
Greek giants
Helios in mythology
Mythological Greek archers
Retinue of Artemis
Deeds of Gaia
Deeds of Hermes